Perfluoro tert-butylcyclohexane is a perfluorinated chemical compound (or perfluorocarbon, PFC).  It is a component of the experimental therapeutic oxygen carrier called Oxycyte.

Chemical properties
Perfluoro tert-butylcyclohexane is a saturated alicyclic perfluorocarbon with the molecular formula C10F20. Fluorocarbons are known for their strong gas-dissolving properties which, when used with oxygen, fill a dual role of healing the tissue as well as imaging. It fits the imaging role promisingly due to its biocompatibility and half-life. A similar compound, perfluorobutane, is already used for ultrasound imaging. Healing decompression sickness with oxygen has a similar mechanism of action to healing brain anemia, and so Oxycyte can be used for this.

Oxycyte

Oxycyte was invented by Leland Clark and developed by Tenax Therapeutics (formerly Oxygen Biotherapeutics, Inc. and Synthetic Blood International).  It is designed to enhance oxygen delivery to damaged tissues. Through a collaborative agreement, Oxycyte (under the development code name of ABL-101) was being developed by Aurum Biosciences Ltd, with an initial indication in acute ischemic stroke. Tenax claims that Oxycyte can carry oxygen with up to 5 times the efficiency of hemoglobin when used as an intravenous emulsion, making it an effective means of transporting oxygen to tissues and carrying carbon dioxide to the lungs for disposal.  However, because Oxycyte is a PFC and not based on hemoglobin, it does not have the safety issues associated with hemoglobin-based products; there have been no adverse events in company clinical trials related to Oxycyte. Tenax believed Oxycyte has a very favorable risk-benefit profile for its potential indications.

Aurum Biosciences promoted Oxycyte as having potential for use in multiple indications, including cardiology, oncology, epilepsy, and neurodegenerative diseases. These claims greatly raised Tenax's stock price, which hasn't come close since.

Around September 2004, Oxycyte finished Phase I trials with few mild side effects. Clinical interest in Oxycyte began to grow during this period, culminating in 2013.

Aurum Biosciences had received Wellcome Trust HICF funding to take Oxycyte into a phase IIa clinical trial in stroke patients. This work investigated both therapeutic potential and its ability to enhance the diagnostic potential of MRI in stroke.

However, Oxygen Biotherapeutics announced in September 2014 that it would discontinue a Phase IIb trial for its Oxycyte drug candidate, citing "difficulties enrolling patients". Interest in Oxycyte has tapered off since, and is mostly documented as an investment venture.

Care should be taken about the blood with this compound, as it's associated with potentially dangerous variations in the blood, like viscosity.

References

External links 
 Drugbank DB12477: Perfluoro tert-butylcyclohexane

Blood substitutes
Fluorocarbons